HTOL can be an abbreviation for:

 High temperature operating life, a method of estimating the operating life of a product
 Horizontal take-off and landing, as opposed to Vertical take-off and landing
 STOL, Short take-off and landing
 CTOL, Conventional take-off and landing
 STOBAR, Short take-off but arrested recovery
 CATOBAR, Catapult-assisted take-off but arrested recovery

See also
HOTOL